Alpine Meadows is an unincorporated community in Placer County, California.

Community
Alpine Meadows encompasses approximately five square miles and serves a permanent population of approximately 500 residents. This includes four commercial centers, a 30-unit apartment complex, 462 single-family homes, and 130 condominiums.

Public services
Alpine Meadows is served by the Alpine Springs County Water District since 1962. Fire services are contracted to the North Tahoe Fire Protection District. The community is governed by Homeowner association rules set by the HOA's in the area, including: Bear Creek HOA, Alpine Meadows Condos, Alpine Manor, and Alpine Place. Due to the fire danger in the area, the Bear Creek Association created a set of mandatory Defensible space (fire control) requirements for all homeowners and vacant land owners inside the Bear Creek HOA to follow. Garbage services are contracted to Tahoe Truckee Sierra Disposal Inc. Electricity is provided by Liberty Energy.

Ski resort

The Alpine Meadows ski resort in the North Lake Tahoe California area, near Squaw Valley. The resort has 11 chairlifts and two surface lifts covering  of terrain. Minimal accommodations are available at the resort itself, so most people opt for a hotel at Tahoe City, Squaw Valley, Donner Pass, or Truckee.

Film location
Alpine Meadows played the part of the fictional "Alpine College" in the 1966 Universal Pictures comedy film, Wild Wild Winter, with all of the exterior sequences being shot on location.

Climate
The Köppen Climate System classifies Long Barn as having a Hot-summer Mediterranean climate, abbreviated as "Csb".

References

External links
Liberty Energy official website
Tahoe Truckee Sierra Disposal Inc official website
North Tahoe Fire Department official website
Alpine Springs County Water and Sewer District official website
Bear Creek Homeowners Association official website
Alpine Meadows Ski Resort official website
Alpine Meadows GPS/Mapping data and photographs at Trailspotting

Unincorporated communities in Placer County, California
Populated places in the Sierra Nevada (United States)
Unincorporated communities in California